Rank the Prank is a hidden camera game show show began on CBBC starting on 3 September 2016. In Canada it began on BBC Kids on 30 January 2017. A first look was released on 18 July 2016. It also premiered on Nickelodeon in the United States on 24 October 2016.

Format
The show features two prank-loving kids are each teamed up with a Hollywood special effects master, to perform an incredible hidden-camera prank on the unknowing public. In a bid to out-prank each other, the child who pulls off the highest ranking prank will get the opportunity to stage the ultimate, mind-blowing hoax on their family or friends.

The Effectors
The Effectors are a groups of stunt artists, special-effect artists and make-up artists who help the pranksters with their pranks. Sabrina Jalees narrates the series.

Abbi Collins
Rob Mayor
Adrien Morot 
Marc Reichel
Shaune Harrison
Eliane Achkar
Simon Tayler
Andy Antonie
Hassan Aziz
Danny Hargreaves
Nick Porter

Episodes

References

External links
 

Hidden camera television series
2010s British children's television series
BBC children's television shows
English-language television shows
2010s Canadian comedy television series
2016 British television series debuts
2016 British television series endings
BBC high definition shows
BBC television game shows
2010s British game shows